The Chicken Rice Shop is a Malaysian family restaurant chain established in June 2000.

Locations

To date, there are more than 100 outlets in Peninsular Malaysia and East Malaysia (excluding Labuan).

References

2000 establishments in Malaysia
Restaurants in Malaysia
Fast-food franchises
Restaurants established in 2000
Fast-food poultry restaurants
Petaling Jaya
Privately held companies of Malaysia
Halal restaurants